{
Anne Quesney is the director of the pro-choice campaign group Abortion Rights. Prior to this she was an international campaigns coordinator for Landmine Action, also campaigns coordinator for the National Abortion Campaign, and education development officer for Education for Choice. She has also written for the New Statesman.

References

External links
 https://www.theguardian.com/society/2006/aug/09/health.healthandwellbeing1 Interview with Guardian
 http://www.newstatesman.com/writers/anne_quesney profile at new statesman
 http://commentisfree.guardian.co.uk/anne_quesney/profile.html Profile at The Guardian

Year of birth missing (living people)
Living people
British abortion-rights activists